Somery is a compilation album by the American punk rock band the Descendents, released in 1991 through SST Records. It compiles songs from their Fat EP (1981) and the albums Milo Goes to College (1982), I Don't Want to Grow Up (1985), Enjoy! (1986), and All (1987).

Background 
In 1987 SST Records had purchased the Descendents' previous label New Alliance Records, releasing their 1987 album All and re-releasing all of their previous material. Following the Descendents' final tours in spring and summer 1987, singer Milo Aukerman had left the band to pursue a career in biochemistry. The remaining members—bassist Karl Alvarez, guitarist Stephen Egerton, and drummer Bill Stevenson—relaunched the band under the name All, releasing three albums on the SST subsidiary Cruz Records between 1988 and 1991 with singers Dave Smalley and Scott Reynolds. SST also released the Descendents live albums Liveage! (1987) and Hallraker: Live! (1989), both recorded during the final two Descendents tours. Somery was released in 1991, compiling tracks from the Descendents' past studio releases. Stevenson created the cover art for the compilation while Egerton did the graphics. The Descendents would later reunite with Aukerman in 1995 to record Everything Sucks.

Stevenson remarked in 1993 that "Somery sold more than any of the Descendents albums put together. All the kids are just now getting into it, so that way they can buy one record and kind of get into it and see what it's all about, and then if they really like it they can buy all the other records. See, back when we were touring, nobody came to see us. It's only now [that] the Descendents have become popular."

Reception 

Stephen Thomas Erlewine of Allmusic gave Somery four and a half stars out of five, saying that although "a handful of great songs from their best albums are missing, Somery nevertheless selects the highlights from their occasionally uneven records, making it a useful and comprehensive retrospective." Erlewine's colleague Mike DaRonco called it a felony that "Pep Talk" from All was not included on the compilation. Rock critic Robert Christgau gave the album an A− rating, opining that the 1988 compilation Two Things at Once contained the band's best material, "But anyone beguiled, enthralled, or smacked between the eyes by how nakedly these guys don't quite understand their class rage and love-hungry sexual anxiety will hear through their bouts of misogyny and sophomoric humor for the 19 more tuneful if less inspired selections from three later and lesser albums, as in the tortured breakup song/metaphor 'Clean Sheets' and the fuckup/square's confession 'Coolidge'." Jenny Eliscu of Rolling Stone called Somery "the only Descendents record to qualify as must-have. It's got virtually all of the winning songs, from the goofy hardcore tunes [...] to the more commercial-sounding rockers".

Track listing

Personnel 
Band
Karl Alvarez – bass guitar on tracks from All
Milo Aukerman – vocals
Doug Carrion – bass guitar on tracks from Enjoy!
Ray Cooper – guitar on tracks from I Don't Want to Grow Up and Enjoy!
Stephen Egerton – guitar on tracks from All, graphics
Frank Navetta – guitar on tracks from the Fat EP and Milo Goes to College
Tony Lombardo – bass guitar on tracks from the Fat EP, Milo Goes to College, and I Don't Want to Grow Up
Bill Stevenson – drums, cover art, producer of tracks from I Don't Want to Grow Up, Enjoy!, and All

Production
Richard Andrews – engineer of tracks from Enjoy! and All
Ethan James – engineer of tracks from Enjoy!
Spot – producer and engineer of tracks from the Fat EP and Milo Goes to College
David Tarling – producer and engineer of tracks from I Don't Want to Grow Up

References

External links

Somery at YouTube (streamed copy where licensed)

Descendents albums
1991 compilation albums
SST Records compilation albums
Albums produced by Bill Stevenson (musician)